Epiphora rectifascia is a moth of the  family Saturniidae. It is found in Cameroon, the Democratic Republic of Congo, Kenya, Nigeria, Tanzania, Uganda and Zambia.

Subspecies
Epiphora rectifascia rectifascia
Epiphora rectifascia watulegei Rougeot, 1974 (Kenya, Tanzania and Uganda)
Epiphora rectifascia ileshana Rougeot, 1955 (Nigeria)

References

Saturniinae
Moths of Africa
Fauna of Zambia
Moths described in 1907